Louise Catherine Ivers is an Irish and American infectious disease specialist physician. She is faculty director of the Harvard Global Health Institute, executive director of the Massachusetts General Hospital Center for Global Health, and Professor of Medicine and Professor of Global Health and Social Medicine at Harvard Medical School. Ivers began working in global health in the mid '90s as a medical student in Dublin, with a focus on addressing social justice by advancing access to health. In 2003 she joined with Haitian leaders to scale up primary care and HIV treatment in Haiti with Zanmi Lasante, the Haitian sister organization of Partners In Health. As a survivor of the 2010 Haiti earthquake and during the 2010 Haiti cholera outbreak, Ivers led major humanitarian and public health responses, resulting in increased access to HIV, TB and cholera treatment and prevention. She has served as a technical advisor to the World Health Organization.

Early life and education
Ivers was born and raised in Dublin, Ireland, as the middle of three children. She remained in her home country for her medical degree at University College Dublin (UCD), before traveling to the United States for her residency in internal medicine at the Massachusetts General Hospital, a fellowship in infectious diseases at Harvard University, and Master's Degree in Public Health from the Harvard School of Public Health. She later received a diploma in tropical medicine and hygiene from the London School of Hygiene & Tropical Medicine in the U.K. and a doctorate in medicine from UCD.

Career
Ivers joined the non-profit organization, Partners In Health (PIH) in 2003 as a doctor working in a rural Haitian community health center caring for patients with HIV, TB, and children with malnutrition. She became clinical director as the organization expanded and furthered its collaboration with the Haitian government. Under the mentorship of Paul Farmer, and with local leaders Fernet Leandre and Loune Viaud she helped expand the organization's reach across Haiti from a three-room clinic to ten new facilities including clinics with examining rooms, laboratories, pharmacies, and small inpatient wards, as well as isolation rooms for TB patients. The organization became well known for its approach to increasing access to HIV care through investment in primary health expansion and health system strengthening.

During her time in Haiti the country suffered a cholera outbreak and earthquake. She was at a meeting in Port-au-Prince at the time of the January 2010 earthquake about which she wrote "Five patients in our improvised driveway clinic died in our arms, some were ultimately evacuated overseas, others died later, and many are still waiting for the surgery that they desperately need". Following the January 2010 earthquake in Haiti, she was appointed Chief of Mission for PIH and subsequently led a major humanitarian and public health response, resulting in increased access to basic humanitarian services for displaced persons and to HIV and TB treatment. In recognition of her efforts in Haiti, Ivers was honored as the 2011 Distinguished Graduate for UCD, as the recipient of the Bailey K. Ashford Medal from the American Society of Tropical Medicine and Hygiene and, with Farmer and Ophelia Dahl as Bostonians of the Year in 2010. Driven by witnessing many deaths from cholera, Ivers was outspoken on the need to expand the humanitarian response to the Haitian cholera outbreak by using cholera vaccination as part of a comprehensive strategy. At the request of Minister of Health Florence Guillaume, her team led a mass vaccination campaign against cholera and later published a paper in 2015 showing that PIH's intervention and vaccine distribution was protective against cholera. From 2015 until 2017, she was a member of the executive leadership team at PIH responsible for global strategic implementation and served as a technical advisor to the World Health Organization and the Haitian Ministry of Health.

In 2019, Ivers was elected a Member of the American Society for Clinical Investigation and was the recipient of the Havard T Chan School of Public Health Leadership In Public Health Practice Award. During the COVID-19 pandemic, Ivers and Wilfredo Matias published an op-ed "calling out fundamental weaknesses in the country's public health data systems, which are unable to capture accurate data on where, why and how the virus spreads in real time." She later urged the Governor of Massachusetts, Charlie Baker, to speed up the rollout of COVID-19 vaccinations. At the beginning of the pandemic, Ivers and David Walton wrote an editorial calling for equity in Covid-19 response and that "as the world races to find an effective antiviral against severe acute respiratory syndrome coronavirus-2, as well as a vaccine, will these become sovereign commodities of the global North? We see no reason why injustices of the past will not be repeated just because the pathogen is novel".

References

External links

Living people
20th-century Irish medical doctors
American infectious disease physicians
Alumni of University College Dublin
Physicians of Massachusetts General Hospital
Harvard Medical School faculty
Harvard School of Public Health alumni
Members of the American Society for Clinical Investigation
Year of birth missing (living people)
Irish emigrants to the United States